WBSZ (93.3 FM) is a radio station broadcasting a ""New Country" format, licensed to Ashland, Wisconsin, United States.  The station is currently owned by Heartland Communications Group, LLC, and features programming from ABC Radio and Westwood One. It serves Ashland and Bayfield counties.

Its studios and transmitter are located at 2320 Ellis Avenue in Ashland, along with its sister stations.

References

External links
WBSZ-FM

BSZ
Country radio stations in the United States